Lambertia echinata, commonly known as prickly honeysuckle, is a shrub which is endemic to the south-west of Western Australia.

References

Eudicots of Western Australia
echinata
Endemic flora of Southwest Australia